The Meaning of Life is an Irish television programme, broadcast on RTÉ One. Presented by Gay Byrne, each edition involves the veteran broadcaster interviewing a prominent public figure.

Interviews with former Taoiseach Bertie Ahern and actors Gabriel Byrne and Brenda Fricker during the second series attracted media attention. Ahern spoke of his religious habits, Byrne and Fricker of being sexually abused as children.

Episode list

First series

Second series

Third series

Fourth series

Fifth series

Sixth series

Seventh series

Seventh series (Special episode)

Eighth series

Ninth series
The ninth series began airing on 4 May 2014.

Tenth series

Eleventh series

Twelfth series

Reception

John Boland of the Irish Independent claimed the series became "more religious in thrust and tone as it progressed". He described the episode featuring Neil Jordan as a "bizarre encounter", in which the writer and filmmaker "grew more and more bemused" as Byrne questioned him in great detail about his religious faith. Jordan answered such questions as "Do you think your religion might return to you on your deathbed?" and "Do you think there's a day of reckoning?" with "I really haven't got a clue" and "I don't know, Gay" but when he commented that "every time I'm in a plane and it's hit by lightning I bless myself", Byrne replied "Hah!", as if, according to Boland, Jordan had "just revealed a basic faith in the Catholic Almighty rather than a reflex reaction to imminent catastrophe".

The Irish Timess Kevin Courtney said of The Meaning of Life: "The title is a bit grandiose – you could just as easily call it Tell Uncle Gaybo All About It.

Byrne prefers not to discuss his own faith:

Viewing figures
An average of 247,000 viewers tuned into the first four episodes of the series, featuring interviews with Farrell, Adams, Binchy and Keating. The episode featuring Keating attracted the most viewers, with a total of 258,000 reported. Next was the Adams interview, with 251,000 viewers. This was followed by the interview with Binchy which had 231,000 viewers.

References

External links
 Official website

2009 Irish television series debuts
2010s Irish television series
Irish religious television series
RTÉ original programming
Works about meaning of life